The list of shipwrecks in 2012 includes ships sunk, foundered, grounded, or otherwise lost during 2012.

January

1 January

2 January

4 January

7 January

8 January

11 January

12 January

13 January

14 January

15 January

16 January

20 January

22 January

24 January

25 January

26 January

27 January

29 January

30 January

31 January

February

2 February

5 February

7 February

8 February

10 February

13 February

14 February

15 February

16 February

18 February

19 February

22 February

23 February

24 February

27 February

28 February

29 February

March

2 March

5 March

7 March

9 March

10 March

13 March

14 March

15 March

19 March

27 March

April

1 April

3 April

4 April

5 April

10 April

23 April

30 April

May

2 May

3 May

4 May

12 May

18 May

19 May

23 May

26 May

29 May

June

25 June

July

2 July

12 July

14 July

17 July

18 July

August

2 August

8 August

16 August

26 August

28 August

30 August

31 August

September

1 September

6 September

21 September

24 September

25 September

26 September

27 September

28 September

October

1 October

2 October

4 October

5 October

14 October

20 October

21 October

28 October

29 October

30 October

31 October

November

3 November

10 November

14 November

19 November

28 November

29 November

December

4 December

5 December

6 December

7 December

11 December

14 December

18 December

24 December

28 December

29 December

31 December

References

2012
 
Ship